The first USS Norfolk was a brig in the United States Navy during the Quasi-War with France. 

Norfolk was built by the city of Norfolk, Virginia for the public service at the beginning of the Quasi-War with France in 1798. Captain Thomas Williams was appointed to the command and she was reported ready for sea, except for her other officers, on 9 September 1798.

Service history
Captain Alexander Murray, commanding 
, was advised that Norfolk was to be included in the little squadron under his command.

On the cruise south Retaliation was captured by two French ships. Montezuma and Norfolk, after recapturing a small American vessel which had been captured by the French, put in at Antigua. Thereafter Norfolk cruised near St. Kitts.

Norfolk joined Commodore Truxtun's squadron and 20 January 1799 the Commodore ordered Captain Williams to join him at Basseterre, St. Kitts. Norfolk sailed northward with a convoy of merchant ships 6 March, and proceeded to Philadelphia.

Master Commandant William Bainbridge was ordered to relieve Captain Williams 29 March and to refit the ship for sea as soon as possible. Norfolk then sailed to St. Kitts to join Truxtun's squadron; she arrived Basse-terre Roads 17 May and was subsequently ordered to Commodore Thomas Tingey's Squadron. In company with  16 June Norfolk captured the French privateer Vainqueur off Guadeloupe.

Norfolk arrived New York 14 August with French prisoners. After extensive repairs, she was ordered to the West Indies again 16 September, cruising on the San Domingo Station and later in the vicinity of Havana, actively protecting American commerce and opening island ports to American trade. She sailed from Havana 3 April 1800 with a number of merchant ships under convoy, arriving Philadelphia 12 April.  

Lt. Thomas Calvert took command of Norfolk 29 April, and on 20 May she was ordered to convoy vessels to Cartagena and then to take up station with the squadron at San Domingo. Norfolk sailed in June and en route encountered two French privateers, but both escaped, one after a half hour's fight in which Lt. Calvert was seriously wounded. Lt. Calvert was ordered by Commodore Murray 2 August to take under convoy vessels from Cartagena and Cape St. Nicole Mole and proceed with them to the coast of North America, after which, due to Norfolks poor condition, he sailed to Baltimore.

Benjamin Stoddert, the Secretary of the Navy, ordered Lt. Calvert to pay off the crew of Norfolk 21 October, to remove her stores and furnishings, and to prepare her for sale. Norfolk was subsequently sold, probably in November 1800.

References

Brigs of the United States Navy
Quasi-War ships of the United States
1798 ships